Dragoș Mihalcea (born December 17, 1977) is the Principal dancer with the Royal Swedish Ballet.

Mihalcea was born in Bucharest, Romania and studied ballet at the urging of his parents. At the age of 14 he received a full scholarship from the Kirov Academy of Ballet in Washington, DC. Between 1997-2000 he performed with the Universal Ballet Company in South Korea where he attained the position of principal dancer. At 20 years old, he began his international career, performing in roles such as Prince Siegfried in Swan Lake, Prince Desire in Sleeping Beauty and Albrecht in Giselle. He won two bronze medals at the Luxembourg International Ballet Competition and the Rudolph Nureyev International Ballet Competition along with a gold medal at the Premio Roma Danza International Competition. Later he was invited to the Norwegian National Opera & Ballet, and then became a principal dancer with the Royal Swedish Ballet. In 2006, he joined the National Ballet Company Het in Amsterdam as a principal dancer, before returning to perform in Sweden in 2008.

His performance in Eugene Onegin was acclaimed.

See also 
 Ballet company
 Ballet music
 Glossary of ballet
 History of ballet
 Timeline of ballet

References

External links 

1977 births
Living people
Romanian male ballet dancers
Principal dancers
Place of birth missing (living people)